Wu Chin-jing (born 15 May 1958) is a Taiwanese sprint hurdler. He competed in the men's 4 × 100 metres relay at the 1988 Summer Olympics. He won the gold medal at the 1983 Asian Championships. He also competed at the 1983 and 1987 World Championships without reaching the final.

References

1958 births
Living people
Athletes (track and field) at the 1984 Summer Olympics
Athletes (track and field) at the 1988 Summer Olympics
Taiwanese male hurdlers
Olympic athletes of Taiwan
Place of birth missing (living people)
World Athletics Championships athletes for Chinese Taipei